The Scugog River is a river in the city of Kawartha Lakes in Central Ontario, Canada. It is in the Kawartha Lakes region, is part of the Great Lakes Basin, and is a branch of the Trent-Severn Waterway.

The river flows north from the northeast end of Lake Scugog, goes under Ontario Highway 7, heads through the community of Lindsay where it passes through Trent-Severn Waterway Lock 33 and associated control dams, and reaches its mouth at Sturgeon Lake. Sturgeon Lake flows via the Otonabee River and the Trent River to Lake Ontario.

Tributaries
East Cross Creek (right)
Mariposa Brook (left)

See also
List of Ontario rivers

References

Sources

Rivers of Kawartha Lakes